Robinsonekspedisjonen: 2000 was the second season of Robinsonekspedisjonen, the Norwegian version of the Swedish show Expedition Robinson. It aired from 10 September to 3 December 2000. Christer Falch was the host for the second season of Robinsonekspedisjonen and  has been the host ever since. Therese Andersen won the 2000 season over Ihne Vagmo by an unknown margin in the secret ballot, becoming the first female to win the Norwegian version. The ratings for the second season were much better than those of the first.

Finishing order

External links
http://www.vg.no
http://www.dagbladet.no/kultur/2000/04/09/200606.html
http://tux1.aftenposten.no/kul_und/kultur/d171191.htm

 2000
2000 Norwegian television seasons